Vesele is a village subordinated to Spartak rural council in Yasynuvata Raion (district) in Donetsk Oblast of eastern Ukraine, at 9.2 km NW from the centre of Donetsk city. The settlement borders from north with a runway of the former Donetsk airport.

The village was taken under control of pro-Russian forces during the War in Donbass, that started in 2014.

Demographics
In 2001 the village had 569 inhabitants. Native language distribution as of the Ukrainian Census of 2001:
Ukrainian: 15.29%
Russian: 84.18%
Armenian: 0.35%

References

Villages in Donetsk Raion